Bada Huesca is a team of handball based in Huesca, Spain. It plays in Liga ASOBAL.

History

The club handball section was established in 1995. The team has been playing continuously in the first division, the Liga ASOBAL, since 2011. The team played in an international cup (EHF Cup) once in the 2014/15 season.

Crest, colours, supporters

Naming history

Kits

Sports Hall information

Name: – Palacio Municipal de Deportes
City: – Huesca
Capacity: – 4500
Address: – Calle San Jorge, 76, 22003, Huesca, Spain

Management

Team

Current squad 

Squad for the 2022–23 season

Technical staff
 Head coach:  José Francisco Nolasco
 Assistant coach:  Fernando Pérez Santolaria
 Assistant coach:  Lucas Calvo Sevilla
 Fitness coach:  Pedro Barrio Menoyo
 Physiotherapist:  Luisa Pérez Larre
 Physiotherapist:  Sergio Ferrer Leiva
 Club Doctor:  Martín Blecua Alonso

Transfers

Transfers for the 2022–23 season

Joining 
  Diógenes Cruz (CB) from  Balonmano Sinfín
  Leonardo Terçariol (GK) from  BM Logroño La Rioja
  Ignacio Suárez Uribe-Echeverria (CB) from  CB Burgos
  Frank Cordiés (LB) from  BM Alarcos

Leaving 
  Sergio Pérez Manzanares (CB) to  Saint-Raphaël Var Handball
  Asier Nieto Marcos (CB) to  Bidasoa Irún
  César Almeida (GK) to  Nancy Handball
  Joao Paulo de Sousa (LB) to  Helvetia Anaitasuna
  Miguel Lamelas Gomes (CB) to  Polisportiva Cingoli
  Álex Marcelo (RW)

Previous squads

Season by season

European competition

EHF Cup: It was formerly known as the IHF Cup until 1993. Also, starting from the 2012–13 season the competition has been merged with the EHF Cup Winners' Cup. The competition will be known as the EHF European League from the 2020–21 season.

As of 30 September 2022:

Participations in EHF Cup: 1x

EHF ranking

Former club members

Notable former players

  Álvaro Cabanas (2015-2016)
  Agustín Casado (2014-2016)
  Rodrigo Corrales (2012–2014)
  Carlos Molina (2013–2015)
  Asier Nieto Marcos (2018-2022)
  Álvaro Ruiz Sánchez (2011–2013)
  Joan Saubich (2009-2010, 2011-2013)
  Nicolás Bonanno (2016-2019)
  Gonzalo Carró (2016–2019)
  Martín Ariel Doldan (2015–2016)
  Agustín Vidal (2009–2010)
  Federico Matías Vieyra (2011–2012)
  Adam Savić (2014–2015)
  César Almeida (2021-2022)
  Rudolph Hackbarth (2021-)
  Henrique Teixeira (2016–2018)
  Leonardo Terçariol (2022-)
  Emil Feuchtmann (2006-2007)
  Patricio Martínez Chávez (2000-2003, 2007-2009)
  Rodrigo Salinas Muñoz (2010–2011)
  Miguel Espinha Ferreira (2020–2021)
  Filipe Mota (2018–2020)
  Dimitrije Pejanović (2015–2016)
  Stanislav Demovič (2012-2013)

Former coaches

References

External links
 
 

Spanish handball clubs
Sports teams in Aragon
Liga ASOBAL teams
Handball clubs established in 1995
Sport in Huesca